Vacuolar protein sorting-associated protein 4B is a protein that in humans is encoded by the VPS4B gene.

The protein encoded by this gene is a member of the AAA protein family (ATPases associated with diverse cellular activities), and is the homolog of the yeast Vps4 protein. 

In humans, two paralogs of the yeast protein have been identified. They share a high degree of amino acid sequence similarity with each other, and also with yeast Vps4 and mouse proteins. Functional studies indicate that both human paralogs associate with the endosomal compartments, and are involved in intracellular protein trafficking, similar to Vps4 protein in yeast. The gene encoding this paralog has been mapped to chromosome 18; the gene for the other (VPS4A) resides on chromosome 16.

References

Further reading